Josefa Vila Betancur (born 6 February 1997) is a Chilean rower. She competed in the women's lightweight double sculls event at the 2016 Summer Olympics. Vila is a business engineering student at the Federico Santa María Technical University in Valparaíso.

References

External links
 

1997 births
Living people
Chilean female rowers
Olympic rowers of Chile
Rowers at the 2016 Summer Olympics
Sportspeople from Concepción, Chile
Rowers at the 2015 Pan American Games
South American Games bronze medalists for Chile
South American Games medalists in rowing
Competitors at the 2014 South American Games
Pan American Games competitors for Chile
21st-century Chilean women